Sotira is a village located 4 km north of Trikala in the southcentral part of the Trikala regional unit, Greece. The settlement, which became part of the municipality of Trikala in 1883, was dissolved in 2011. Sotira had a population of 562 in 2001.

Population

External links
 Sotira on GTP Travel Pages

See also

List of settlements in the Trikala regional unit

References

Trikala
Populated places in Trikala (regional unit)